Susan Funaya Ideh (born 5 May 1987) is a Nigerian female badminton player. She competed at the 2010 Commonwealth Games in New Delhi, India. In 2015, she won the women's singles gold at the All-Africa Games In Maputo, Mozambique.

Achievements

All-Africa Games 
Women's singles

Women's doubles

Mixed doubles

African Championships 
Women's singles

Women's doubles

Mixed doubles

BWF International Challenge/Series
Women's singles

Women's doubles

Mixed doubles

 BWF International Challenge tournament
 BWF International Series tournament
 BWF Future Series tournament

References

External links
 

1987 births
Living people
Nigerian female badminton players
Badminton players at the 2010 Commonwealth Games
Commonwealth Games competitors for Nigeria
Competitors at the 2003 All-Africa Games
Competitors at the 2007 All-Africa Games
Competitors at the 2011 All-Africa Games
Competitors at the 2015 African Games
African Games gold medalists for Nigeria
African Games silver medalists for Nigeria
African Games bronze medalists for Nigeria
African Games medalists in badminton
20th-century Nigerian women
21st-century Nigerian women